E. glaucus  may refer to:
 Elymus glaucus, the blue wild rye, a wild rye species native to North America from Alaska to New York to northern Mexico
 Erigeron glaucus, the seaside fleabane, beach aster or seaside daisy, a flowering plant species native to the coastline of Oregon and California

See also
 Glaucus (disambiguation)